Adriana Raquel Bortolozzi de Bogado (born 1 March 1949, Gessler, Santa Fe) is an Argentine Justicialist Party politician. She served both as a member of the Argentine Senate and in the Argentine Chamber of Deputies, representing Formosa Province in the majority block of the Front for Victory.

Bortolozzi qualified as a lawyer in 1981 at the Universidad Nacional del Nordeste (UNNE). From 1985 to 1987 she was minister of social action for Formosa Province and assisted the governor's office on issues concerning native peoples. From 1989 to 1996 she served as a provincial deputy and was then elected to the Argentine Chamber of Deputies in 1996, serving for a year until she resigned. From 1997 until 2001 she was once again a provincial deputy, and then returned to the Argentine Congress as a national deputy from 2001 to 2005. She was elected a senator in 2005.

Her husband Floro Bogado has been vice governor of Formosa since 1995 having himself been governor from 1983 to 1987, and their son Adrián Floro Bogado is a provincial deputy.

External links
Senate profile

References

Living people
People from San Jerónimo Department
Members of the Argentine Senate for Formosa
Justicialist Party politicians
Members of the Argentine Chamber of Deputies elected in Formosa
1949 births
Women members of the Argentine Senate
Women members of the Argentine Chamber of Deputies
20th-century Argentine women politicians
20th-century Argentine politicians
21st-century Argentine women politicians
21st-century Argentine politicians